Paul Cox may refer to:

Paul Alan Cox, American ethnobotanist
Paul Cox (director) (1940–2016), Australian film director
Paul Cox (footballer) (born 1972), English footballer and football manager
Paul Cox (musician), conductor of the Reading Youth Orchestra